Réginald Bélair (April 6, 1949 – March 3, 2020) was a Canadian politician.

Bélair was a Liberal member of the House of Commons of Canada from 1988 to 2004, representing the riding of Cochrane—Superior until 1997 and subsequently Timmins—James Bay. Bélair also worked as an administrator, a manager, and a political assistant. In the House of Commons, Bélair was a Deputy Chairman of Committees of the Whole, and was the Parliamentary Secretary to the Minister of Public Works (Public Works and Government Services) and the Parliamentary Secretary to the Minister of Supply and Services (Public Works and Government Services).

Bélair was born in Hearst, Ontario. He served as a municipal councillor in Kapuskasing for three years.

Retirement
In the 2004 federal election, electoral redistribution put Bélair's home area of Kapuskasing outside of Timmins—James Bay and into the newly named riding of Algoma—Manitoulin—Kapuskasing, an extension of the Algoma—Manitoulin riding held by Liberal colleague Brent St. Denis. Bélair at first announced that he might seek the Liberal nomination in Algoma—Manitoulin—Kapuskasing, then announced his retirement instead.

He died from cancer at a hospital in Kapuskasing on March 3, 2020, at the age of seventy.

References

External links

1949 births
2020 deaths
Deaths from cancer in Ontario
Franco-Ontarian people
Members of the House of Commons of Canada from Ontario
Liberal Party of Canada MPs
Ontario municipal councillors
People from Kapuskasing
People from Hearst, Ontario
21st-century Canadian politicians